The Saskatchewan Junior Hockey League was a junior ice hockey based in Saskatchewan and Manitoba from 1948 until 1966. It operated under the jurisdiction of the Saskatchewan Amateur Hockey Association. Two of its teams won the Abbott Cup as the junior champions of Western Canada, and the Flin Flon Bombers won the Memorial Cup as the national junior champion of Canada in 1957. Frank Boucher served as commissioner of the league from 1959 to 1966, until the league disbanded when five of its eight teams joined the newly formed Canadian Major Junior Hockey League.

History
The Saskatchewan Junior Hockey League (SJHL) began play as the North Saskatchewan Junior Hockey League for the 1948–49 season, and was formed in response to teams in South Saskatchewan and Alberta combining to establish the Western Canada Junior Hockey League. The North Saskatchewan Junior Hockey League renamed itself to the Saskatchewan Junior Hockey League for the 1950–51 season.

The league operated under the jurisdiction of the Saskatchewan Amateur Hockey Association, and its teams were eligible for the national junior hockey playoffs as organized by the Canadian Amateur Hockey Association (CAHA). The SJHL and other junior teams in Western Canada addressed the imbalance in Memorial Cup competition in a meeting with CAHA president W. B. George in August 1954. The teams sought permission for any league champion to add three players in the inter-provincial playoffs for the Memorial Cup, and contended that the imbalance in competition caused lack of spectator interest and less prestige for the event. At the next CAHA meeting in January 1955, the request for three additional players for the Abbott Cup representative was approved. Two teams from the SJHL won the Abbott Cup as the junior champions of Western Canada; which included the Flin Flon Bombers in 1957, and the Regina Pats in 1958. Flin Flon also won the Memorial Cup in 1957, as the national junior champion of Canada. 

Frank Boucher served as commissioner of the Saskatchewan Junior Hockey League from 1959 to 1966. He proposed to establish a junior hockey league of the best twelve teams in Canada sponsored by the National Hockey League (NHL), and to compete for a trophy at a higher tier than the Memorial Cup. CAHA president Art Potter and the resolutions committee were against increasing NHL influence into amateur hockey in Canada and declined to present the proposal at the semi-annual meeting. Potter also wanted more study into programs to support continued junior hockey growth and the Memorial Cup. Boucher and team owners in Saskatchewan and Manitoba accused Potter and the CAHA of disregarding their concerns and favouring the Edmonton Oil Kings. Boucher threatened to withdraw the SJHL from the Memorial Cup playoffs, due to the "unfair domination of western junior hockey by the Edmonton Oil Kings", since they had the pick of all the players from Alberta and used loopholes in rules to import stronger players. After a playoffs game between the Edmonton Oil Kings and the Estevan Bruins in April 1963, Potter announced that broadcast rights for CAHA games by Ken Newmans of CHAB in Moose Jaw, and Linus Westerbeg of CKOS-TV in Yorkton, had been indefinitely suspended. Potter stated that the suspensions resulted from "continuously and severely criticizing officials, thereby giving an erroneous picture of the game as played".

The SJHL disbanded following the 1965–66 season, when five of its eight teams joined the newly formed Canadian Major Junior Hockey League (CMJHL). The two Manitoba-based teams joined the Manitoba Junior Hockey League, and the Melville Millionaires suspended operations. The Saskatchewan Amateur Junior Hockey League was established in 1968, and included teams which formerly played in the SJHL and the CMJHL.

Teams
List of teams that played in the SJHL:

Standings

1948–49 season

Source:

1949–50 season
Standings include one-point games between Humboldt and Prince Albert.

Source:

1950–51 season

Source:

1951–52 season
The 1951–52 season scheduled included games against the Western Canada Junior Hockey League.

Source:

1952–53 season
Al Pickard was elected to be the league's governor.

Source:

1953–54 season
Al Pickard was re-elected to be the league's governor.

Source:

1954–55 season

Source:

1955–56 season

Source:

1956–57 season
Flin Flon won ten games valued at one point instead of two points.

Source:

1957–58 season

Source:

1958–59 season
Moose Jaw played most of its games in Weyburn due to a delay in replacing their home arena which had been damaged in a storm.

Source:

1959–60 season
Games played in Flin Flon were allotted 2.5 points each.

Source:

1960–61 season

Source:

1961–62 season
Prince Albert played the season in Dauphin, Manitoba due to a fire at their arena.

Source:

1962–63 season

Source:

1963–64 season
The Edmonton Oil Kings, a junior hockey team participating in the Central Alberta Hockey League for senior level teams, played an interlocking schedule of two games against each of the seven teams in the SJHL during the 1963–64 season.

Source:

1964–65 season

Source:

1965–66 season

Source:

References

1948 establishments in Canada
1966 disestablishments in Canada
Sports leagues established in 1948
Sports leagues disestablished in 1966
Defunct junior ice hockey leagues in Canada
Defunct ice hockey leagues in Manitoba
Defunct ice hockey leagues in Saskatchewan